DAPA may refer to:
 Defense Acquisition Program Administration, an executive branch of the South Korean government
 Deferred Action for Parents of Americans, a U.S. deferred action immigration program announced on November 20, 2014

Dapa may refer to:
 Dapa, Valle del Cauca, a village in Colombia
 4-hydroxy-tetrahydrodipicolinate synthase, an enzyme